Christian Skår Winther (born 8 May 1989 in Ålesund, Norway) is a Norwegian musician (guitar) and the older brother of jazz drummer Andreas Skår Winther (b. 1991), known from bands like Monkey Plot, Listen to Girl, Ich Bin N!ntendo and Torg.

Career 
Christian Winther is a guitarist, songwriter, improviser, producer and singer. Best known from the improv- and instrumental rock group Monkey Plot, alternative pop duo Listen to Girl, noise punk band Ich Bin N!ntendo, and as a performer and co-producer in Torg. Winther have toured Europe, Japan and South America and released a dusin albums with his different projects. He also run the record label Earthly Habit.

He is educated from the Improvised Music and Jazz Department at the Norwegian Academy of Music with a Master Performance Degree, and in 2014 awarded "Young Jazz Musician of The Year" at Molde International Jazz Festival together with Monkey Plot. 
 
Winther collaborated on the album release Ich Bin N!ntendo & Mats Gustafsson (2012) including Joakim Heibø Johansen (drums) and Magnus Skavhaug Nergaard (bass guitar), featuring Mats Olof Gustafsson (baritone saxophone). Monkey Plot, including Magnus Skavhaug Nergaard (double bass) and Jan Martin Gismervik (drums and percussion), made their debut with the album Løv Og Lette Vimpler (2013).

Discography

In bands 

Ich Bin N!ntendo
2012: Ich Bin N!ntendo & Mats Gustafsson (Va Fongool)
2014: Look (Va Fongool)
2016: Lykke (Shhpuma Records)

Monkey Plot
2013: Løv Og Lette Vimpler (Gigafon)
2015: Angående Omstendigheter Som Ikke Lar Seg Nedtegne (Hubro Music)
2016: Here I Sit, Knowing All Of This (Hubro)

Listen to Girl (formerly (Girl) 
2016: Sea And Dirt (Vilje/SusannaSonata)

Torg

 2018: Palms, Beaches, Dreams (Earthly Habit) 
 2015: Kost/Elak/Gnäll (Jazzland Recordings)

Karokh
2016: Needle, Thread and Nailpolish (No Forevers)
2014: Karokh (Loyal Label)

Other 
2017: Trondheim Jazz Orchestra & Skrap - 'Antropocen' (Fanfare)
2013: Christian Winther / Christian Meaas Svendsen 'M / W' (Va Fongool)

References

External links 

1989 births
Musicians from Ålesund
Living people
Norwegian jazz composers
Norwegian jazz guitarists
Norwegian Academy of Music alumni
21st-century Norwegian guitarists
Monkey Plot members